M. maxima may refer to:

 Manilkara maxima, a plant endemic to Brazil
 Megaceryle maxima, an African kingfisher
 Megathyrsus maximus, a bunch grass
 Melanocorypha maxima, an Asian lark
 Mimusops maxima, an evergreen plant
 Mordella maxima, a tumbling flower beetle
 Mordellistena maxima, a tumbling flower beetle
 Myristica maxima, an Asian plant
 Myrmecia maxima, an Australian ant